This is a list of fictional characters who were companions of the Doctor, in various spin-off media based on the long-running British science fiction television series, Doctor Who.

A

Amy

Amy, portrayed by Ciara Janson, is a companion of the Fifth Doctor in the Key 2 Time series, which includes the plays The Judgement of Isskar, The Destroyer of Delights and The Chaos Pool.

She is a human "tracer", a device designed to track down the segments of the Key to Time across the universe. When the Doctor meets Amy, she is just a few seconds old and recruits the Doctor as her companion to find the Key. At the end of The Chaos Pool, Romana invites Amy to live on Gallifrey and enroll in their Academy.

Amy (now renamed Abby) and her sister Zara return in their own mini-series Graceless.

Antimony
Antimony was a companion of the Seventh Doctor and appeared in the webcast story Death Comes to Time by Colin Meek (widely understood to be a pseudonym for Dan Freedman). At the start of the story, the listener was not aware of the circumstances of his and the Doctor's meeting. Antimony appeared to be a young humanoid male who was slightly unworldly and naive, for example believing there were still Allosauruses roaming the Earth.

During Antimony and the Doctor's battle against the renegade Time Lord, General Tannis, it was revealed that Antimony was in fact an android constructed by the Doctor. The Doctor in Death Comes to Time was very old and, saddened by the death and departure of many companions, had built Antimony as a companion who would never leave him. Tannis totally destroyed Antimony, leaving the Doctor grief-stricken over Antimony's death.

Kevin Eldon provided the voice of Antimony. The illustrations, by Lee Sullivan, depicted Antimony as a humanoid with purplish skin, nonetheless bearing a slight resemblance to Eldon.

Antranak
Antranak was the name Erimem gave to the stray cat she brought aboard the Fifth Doctor's TARDIS at the end of The Eye of the Scorpion. Erimem had adopted the cat, who had in the course of events absorbed a malevolent alien intelligence harmlessly into its mind. Erimem and Peri were quite fond of the cat, the Doctor less so. Antranak departed in Nekromanteia, swapping places with the non-corporeal manifestation of a being called Shara, thereby saving the planet Talderun from destruction. The Doctor later wondered if the alien creature in the cat's mind forced him to act. Erimem, however, remained firm in her belief that her noble cat sacrificed himself of his own accord.

ARC
ARC was an alien creature who travelled with the Eleventh Doctor, Alice Obiefune and John Jones in several 2014/2015 Titan Comics stories.

Lysandra Aristedes
Captain Lysandra Aristedes was introduced as a member of the Forge in the standalone Forge novel Project: Valhalla (2005). She was first voiced by Maggie O'Neill in the 2010 Seventh Doctor audio Project: Destiny, by which time (2026) she has become a high-ranking member of the Forge. She initially hates the Doctor, believing him to be responsible for the deaths of her friends when the Forge's previous headquarters were destroyed. However, she learns to respect the Doctor when she sees him develop a cure for a mutating plague sweeping London where her supervisor Nimrod explicitly modified the cure to kill those infected, and ultimately orders the final destruction of the Forge. Three months later, the Doctor returns and invites her to travel with him, as explained in Black and White. She and the Doctor also travel with another military companion, Private Sally Morgan. They are heard together in the Companion Chronicles story Project: Nirvana and their final story Gods and Monsters.

Arnold
Arnold, a boy from the 30th century, was a short-lived companion for the Third Doctor in the pages of TV Comic in 1973. Introduced in the story Children of the Evil Eye (TVC #1133-#1138), he appeared in only one further story, Nova (TVC #1139-#1147), before being returned to his own time by the Doctor.

B

Barbara

In the film Dr. Who and the Daleks (1965), Barbara (portrayed by Jennie Linden) is one of Dr. Who's granddaughters and the girlfriend of Ian Chesterton. In the plot she takes the role filled by schoolteacher Barbara Wright in the television serial The Daleks, on which the film is based. The character also appears in the Dell comic strip adaptation of the film and the short story The House on Oldark Moor (2000) by Justin Richards.

Beatrice
A companion of the Eighth Doctor mentioned only by name in The Gallifrey Chronicles by Lance Parkin. This may be the same person as Trix MacMillan.

Emily Blandish

Emily Blandish is a companion of an unspecified incarnation of the Doctor, appearing in the Doctor Who spin-off Time Hunter series published by Telos Publishing. She is a ‘time channeller’, a person able to physically travel along people's timelines when working with a ‘time sensitive’ individual. The character's creator, Daniel O'Mahony has stated that he envisages her as resembling the actress Charlotte Coleman.

Bliss
Bliss becomes a companion to the Eighth Doctor during the Time War. She is played by Rakhee Thakrar.

Thomas Brewster
Thomas Brewster, portrayed by John Pickard, was the travelling companion of the Fifth Doctor and Nyssa during a limited story arc in the Big Finish Productions audio dramas. Brewster, a Victorian orphan, meets the Doctor in The Haunting of Thomas Brewster, which culminates with his theft of the TARDIS. He returns it during the events of The Boy That Time Forgot, travelling with the Doctor in the subsequent three-part story Time Reef. In the accompanying single-part story, A Perfect World, Brewster leaves the TARDIS to live in the present day (2008). The 12-part mini-series The Three Companions reveals an adventure he had with Alistair Gordon Lethbridge-Stewart and Polly Wright during the time he had the TARDIS. Later in his life, he starts travelling with the Sixth Doctor and Evelyn Smythe in The Crimes of Thomas Brewster. The Doctor leaves Brewster in Victorian Lancashire, but Brewster ends up leaving Earth with an alien trader in Industrial Evolution.

Catherine Broome
Catherine "Cat" Broome was a companion of the Seventh Doctor from the Telos novella Companion Piece by Robert Perry and Mike Tucker. The Doctor and Cat are already travelling together at the start of the novella. Needing mercury links for the TARDIS, they first attempt to steal some from the Wierdarbi, a race of cybernetically enhanced insects. They then travel to Haven, a planet controlled by the Roman Catholic Church. After Cat was arrested for the murder of an Archbishop, she and the Doctor are sent to the Rome space station to be tried by the Pope. When their spaceship is attacked, the Doctor reprogrammes its robots to defend it. With access to the control room cut off and the TARDIS trapped in a stasis field, The Doctor notes that there is only one robot left who can save the situation. The novella ends at this point, the implication being that Cat is that robot.

Brooke
Brooke is a companion of the Fifth Doctor from the Big Finish Productions audio drama series The Diary of River Song. The pair are already travelling together by the time River Song encounters them. Brooke accompanies the Doctor and River to Vienna. It later transpires that Brooke is a clone of River, sent to the Doctor as an assassin by Madame Kovarian after her previous plot to kill the Doctor on a future incarnation failed. During this encounter Brooke regenerates, revealing to River what she is. Brooke's first incarnation is voiced by Joanna Horton and her second by Nina Toussaint-White (Toussaint-White played River's own second incarnation in "Let's Kill Hitler", which saw her regenerate into the third incarnation portrayed by Kingston).

C

C'rizz

C'rizz, played by Conrad Westmaas, is a companion of the Eighth Doctor and appears in a series of Big Finish Productions Doctor Who audio plays. He is a Eutermesan from the planet Bortresoye. He is mentioned by the Eighth Doctor in the mini-episode "The Night of the Doctor", the first occasion that Big Finish audio characters were directly referenced in the television show.

Alex Campbell
Alex is the Doctor's great-grandson (the son of Susan Campbell) and features in the Eighth Doctor adventures. He is portrayed by Jake McGann.

He is initially wary of the Doctor due to the xenophobic atmosphere on Earth following the Dalek occupation. Despite this, he eventually accepts the Doctor but while he is impressed by the technology of the TARDIS he chooses not to travel with him as he wants to become an architect.

During the second Dalek invasion in the plays Lucie Miller and To The Death, Alex becomes a leader for the human resistance on Earth. He sacrifices himself to allow Lucie and Susan the opportunity to thwart the Daleks' plan.

Tom Campbell

Special Constable Tom Campbell (portrayed by Bernard Cribbins) travelled with Dr. Who in the feature film Daleks' Invasion Earth 2150 A.D.. His role replaces that of the character Ian Chesterton in the television serial The Dalek Invasion of Earth, on which the film is based.

Tom mistook the Doctor's time machine, Tardis, for a real police telephone box while attempting to foil a jewel robbery. He accompanied the Doctor, together with his niece Louise and granddaughter Susan, to the year 2150, where they discovered that the Daleks had invaded Earth. After helping to defeat the Daleks, the Doctor returned him to London a few minutes before the robbery was due to take place, enabling him to catch the thieves. The temporal paradox created by this action is not addressed in the film. 

Cribbins later played Wilfred Mott from 2007 to 2010 in the revived Doctor Who television series.

Alison Cheney
Alison Cheney was a companion of the Doctor who appeared in the flash-animated serial Scream of the Shalka by Paul Cornell and the short story The Feast of the Stone by Cavan Scott and Mark Wright. Her voice was provided by Sophie Okonedo, who was also the visual model for the character, animated by Cosgrove Hall.

Alison was a barmaid from the 21st century who lived in the village of Lannet in Lancashire with her boyfriend Joe, a doctor. Out of all the village inhabitants she was the only one who did not live in fear of the Shalka.

She was instrumental in helping the Doctor defeat the Shalka. At the end of the adventure she admitted she was going to leave Joe even before all of the Shalka problems started, and broke up with him. When the Master asked her to join the Doctor on his travels, she accepted.

Liv Chenka
Liv Chenka is a companion of the Eighth Doctor in the audio series Dark Eyes, for Big Finish Productions, appearing from the second instalment of the series onwards. However, she also encountered the Seventh Doctor in the main range audio story Robophobia, aiding him in an attempt to thwart a supposed robot uprising. She first encountered the Eighth Doctor on the planet Nixyce VII, during a Dalek occupation. From the Doctor's perspective however, he had already met, and subsequently travelled with her in her future. She next met him during an Eminence attack at the edge of the universe, and aided him and Molly O'Sullivan in causing the Eminence's defeat. After this, she joined him in the TARDIS as a companion, travelling to London in the 1970s, where she once again fought the Eminence, this time aided by the Master. The Doctor then left her and Molly in the 1970s in order to maintain the timeline by meeting Liv in her personal past. The character is portrayed by Nicola Walker.

Constance Clarke
Constance Clarke was a WREN at Bletchley Park in World War Two, who met the Doctor in the audio Criss-Cross when he was working undercover at Bletchley trying to determine the origin of a strange signal that had immobilized the TARDIS in 1944. Constance was married to naval officer Henry Clarke, but she had not heard from him for several months. After the Doctor's investigations saw him working with German and British intelligence to thwart an attempted takeover of Earth by a race of sentient waveforms, he invited Constance to travel with him as a temporary reprieve from her duties. While on board the TARDIS, Constance encountered foes such as the Daleks (Order of the Daleks) and the Rani (Planet of the Rani) before she decided to return home. However, her departure was interrupted when she discovered a telegram announcing the death of Henry, only for a plea for help from a trapped alien refugee to lead to the discovery that Henry had actually faked his death to marry a Russian agent that he had been having an affair with. Although she claimed to just be helping the Doctor negotiate a treaty, Constance has continued to travel with the Doctor and returned companion Flip Jackson. 

Constance is played by Miranda Raison

Cinder
Cinder was a Companion to the War Doctor in Engines of War. She was a native of the planet Moldox. She was only 7 when her entire family was killed during a Dalek invasion. She survived only by hiding in a bin, and staying there till found by Coyne, who taught her how to fight. She grew up helping the resistance battle the Daleks, becoming a Dalek hunter. During this time, she got the nickname Cinder. She met the Doctor when she was saved from a Dalek patrol by the TARDIS crash landing. After helping The Doctor discover a Dalek weapons factory where they were building a de-mat weapon, a temporal cannon, in order to destroy Gallifrey, they escaped and warned the Time Lords of the danger. After meeting Rassilon and the High Council on Gallifrey, Cinder was kidnapped by the Time Lords Karlax and The Castellan, and subjected to a mind probe to verify The Doctor's story. The Doctor rescued her from them and they fled to the Death Zone on Gallifrey, and took Borusa, who was being used by Rassilon as a possibility engine, from his captivity in the Dark Tower at its center. After the Time Lords decided that the best course of action was to destroy Moldox, and all the surrounding systems by using the Tear of Isha on the Eye of Tantalus, a black hole being used by the Daleks to power their temporal cannon, and thereby killing billions of sentient beings, she and the doctor fled with the Time Lords' possibility engine. During their time together The Doctor and Cinder realised that there was more to life than fighting the time war and planned to travel together after the Daleks where defeated. However she was shot and killed by Karlax, a Time Lord who had been sent to kill The Doctor, in order to remove the random elements from possibility engine predictions, before this could happen. She threw herself between them, taking the shot meant for The Doctor. After her death the Doctor left Karlax to die at the hands of the Dalek Eternity Circle. After the liberation of Moldox, The Doctor located the remains of Cinder's family and buried them at their homestead. The Doctor (but not the reader) discovers her real name and places a proper marker with it on her grave. Before leaving, he makes her a promise. "No more." It is implied that Cinder's death prompted the Doctor to decide to use The Moment to destroy both Time Lords and Daleks.

Ian Chesterton

In the film Dr. Who and the Daleks (1965), Ian Chesterton (portrayed by Roy Castle) is the boyfriend of Barbara, one of Dr. Who's granddaughters. He takes the role filled by schoolteacher Ian Chesterton in the television serial The Daleks, on which the film is based. Played mainly for comic relief, his character is very different from the portrayal in the television series, appearing as clumsy and inept rather than resourceful and heroic. The character also appears in the Dell comic strip adaptation of the film and the short story The House on Oldark Moor (2000) by Justin Richards.

Claudia
A companion of the Eighth Doctor mentioned in Lance Parkin's Eighth Doctor novels Father Time and The Gallifrey Chronicles. The name Claudia is an in-joke on Parkin's part, referring to The Stranger by Portia Da Costa (Wendy Wootton), an erotic novel in Virgin Publishing's Black Lace range. The Stranger recounts the affair between a widow named Claudia Marwood and a mysterious amnesiac named "Paul", whom da Costa based on Paul McGann's performance as the Doctor. Claudia is said in Father Time to be a widow.

Compassion
Compassion (Laura Tobin) is a character in the Eighth Doctor Adventures and Faction Paradox series of novels and audio dramas. In the audios she is voiced by Jackie Skarvellis. She is a human from 26th Century Earth who becomes a member of a Faction Paradox splinter group called ‘the Remote’, a time travelling voodoo cult. While travelling with the Doctor, she is transformed into a Type 102 TARDIS when her biodata is altered by signals received from the Doctor's TARDIS.

Rachel Cooper
Rachel, played by Lenora Crichlow was a companion of the Seventh Doctor in an alternate timeline. In the Big Finish audio The Architects of History Rachel was working with the Doctor in an effort to put right an alternate reality created by Elizabeth Klein, in which the Nazis had won World War II and then created a Galactic Reich. In the reality where time has run its correct course, she and the Doctor have never met.

Raine Creevy
Raine, played by Beth Chalmers, is a companion to the Seventh Doctor, starting with The Lost Stories audio drama Crime of The Century. The character was originally intended to be the television companion just after Ace left, however the series was cancelled before Ace's character was even given a departure story. In the audio series, Raine travels alongside Ace, rather than replacing her. Raine's father was an English smuggler and her mother was a Russian KGB agent. The Doctor met them 22 years earlier in Thin Ice, where he helped deliver infant Raine. She gestated for only fifteen weeks because her mother's biology was accelerated by ancient Ice Warrior technology. Raine is adept at safecracking, burglary, fencing as well as being a helicopter pilot. She is cultured and high class, in contrast to Ace. After Ace is gone, and much later in the Seventh Doctor's life, he travels with her again in UNIT Dominion.

Chris Cwej

Chris Cwej is a character from the Virgin New Adventures range of Doctor Who spin-offs. His first appearance is in the novel Original Sin by Andy Lane. He is an Adjudicator; a policeman from 30th century Earth. He is described as being tall, blonde and muscular. After various adventures with the Doctor he travels with him to Gallifrey and then later, alone using a time ring given to him by Romana. The character subsequently appears in novels in the Bernice Summerfield range of New Adventures, in which he works as an agent of the Time Lords.

Crystal
Crystal, a nightclub singer, appeared in the stage play Doctor Who - The Ultimate Adventure, written by Terrance Dicks. She was portrayed by Rebecca Thornhill.

In the Big Finish Productions audio adaptation she was portrayed by Claire Huckle.

During the course of the play, she developed a friendship with Zog and also formed a close relationship with fellow companion Jason which eventually became romantic. At the end of the play, Jason persuaded her to accompany them on their travels in the TARDIS.

D

Abslom Daak

Dave
Dave was the alternative name for Jimmy in the 1981 and 1984 regional revivals of the 1974 play Doctor Who and the Daleks in the Seven Keys to Doomsday. The character was named Dave in the script by Terrance Dicks but this had been changed for the original production after actor James Matthews was cast in the role.

Sharon Davies
Sharon Davies is a companion of the Fourth Doctor, appearing in the Doctor Who Magazine comic strip. She is the first non-white recurring companion of the Doctor to appear in any medium. She is played by Rhianne Starbuck in the Big Finish audio adaptation of the comic Doctor Who and the Star Beast.

Oliver Day
Oliver Day is a companion of the Fourth Doctor introduced in the Big Finish Short Trips anthology Short Trips: Snapshots. He first appears in "Attachments" and features in "Flight of the Monkrah" and "Puppeteer", all within that same anthology.

Josie Day
Josie Day is a companion to the Eighth Doctor in Titan Comics. It is eventually revealed that she is a living painting brought to life, bought by the Twelfth Doctor in an auction, who made arrangements that she would travel with his eighth incarnation. After learning this about her, the Doctor invites her to continue travelling with him, which she accepts.

Deborah
A companion of the Eighth Doctor mentioned only by name in The Gallifrey Chronicles by Lance Parkin. The name may refer to the character of Debbie Castle from the novel Father Time, also by Parkin.

Delilah
A companion of the Eighth Doctor mentioned only by name in The Gallifrey Chronicles by Lance Parkin. Nothing more is known about this person.

Destrii

Destrii is a companion of the Eighth Doctor, appearing in the Doctor Who Magazine comic strip. She is a fierce, agile, amphibious humanoid with scaly skin, claws and a face resembling that of a fish. For a time she switches bodies with the Doctor's companion Izzy Sinclair.

Tamsin Drew
Tamsin Drew is a character that appears in the series of Big Finish Productions Doctor Who audio dramas. She initially is a companion of the Eighth Doctor, until she was turned against him by the Meddling Monk and became his companion. She is mentioned by the Eighth Doctor in the TV mini-episode "The Night of the Doctor". Tamsin is played by Niky Wardley.

E

Maxwell Edison
Max is a character that originated in the Doctor Who Magazine comics. He is a resident of the small west country town of Stockbridge, which the Doctor often visits. A UFO spotter and amateur psychic investigator, Max is awkward and often derided by the other locals. He does, however, have some actual psychic abilities, although he doesn't fully understand how to use them. He first met the Fifth Doctor in the 1982 comic Stars Fell on Stockbridge, when a starship disintegrated over the town. Roughly a decade later, he befriended Izzy Sinclair, a teenage girl who shared his interest in space and science fiction. In the 1996 comic End Game, they both encountered the Eighth Doctor, at which point Izzy began travelling in the TARDIS. The Tenth Doctor encountered him in the 2009 comic The Stockbridge Child, which ended with Max being badly stricken while riding his moped. Later that year, he was reunited with the Fifth Doctor in the Big Finish audio story The Eternal Summer. Voiced by Mark Williams, this story involved a complex time trap that ultimately resulted in Max surviving his road incident.

Emma
Emma was the companion of the Ninth Doctor portrayed by Rowan Atkinson in the 1999 spoof charity serial Doctor Who and the Curse of Fatal Death written by Steven Moffat and produced for the charity Comic Relief. She was portrayed by Julia Sawalha, who had previously auditioned for the role of Ace.

The circumstances of their meeting were never explained, but the Doctor had planned to marry her and retire. However, the Master (played by Jonathan Pryce) and the Daleks had other plans, and by the end of the story the Doctor had used up all of his remaining regenerations. The Doctor's thirteenth (and final) incarnation turned out to be a woman (played by Joanna Lumley)—a form that Emma was not interested in marrying, as the Doctor was literally no longer the man she fell in love with. The Doctor, finding the Master suddenly quite attractive, departed with him instead.

Erimem
Erimem is a character, played by Caroline Morris, in a series of Big Finish Productions Doctor Who audio dramas. A princess of Ancient Egypt born in 1419 BC, she is the daughter of Pharaoh Amenhotep II and a companion of the Fifth Doctor. She also appears in Telos novella Blood and Hope and the novel The Coming of the Queen by Iain McLaughlin and Claire Bartlett.

F

Jeremy Fitzoliver
A companion of the Third Doctor, introduced in the Radio 5 audio drama The Paradise of Death and played by Richard Pearce, Jeremy is an inexperienced photographer for Metropolitan, the magazine Sarah Jane Smith works for, with the character mainly being used to provide comic relief. Jeremy subsequently appears in the follow-up drama The Ghosts of N-Space and the Past Doctor Adventures novel Island of Death. Several Big Finish Short Trips stories see Jeremy travel with the Third Doctor during a period where he is unaccompanied by Sarah Jane. One of the villains in the Sixth Doctor Past Doctor Adventures novel Instruments of Darkness is "John Doe", a paranoid amnesiac with a grudge against the Doctor and UNIT. At the end of the novel, following his death, it is revealed he was Jeremy, whose mental problems began when he carelessly activated the Doctor's Image Reproduction Integrating System while the rest of UNIT were too distracted by the current crisis to stop him sitting in it (Planet of the Spiders).

Jimmy Forbes
Jimmy was one of the Doctor's companions in the stage play Doctor Who and the Daleks in the Seven Keys to Doomsday, played by James Matthews. In the Big Finish audio adaptation, he was played by Joseph Thompson.

Roz Forrester
Roslyn (Roz) Forrester is a companion of the Seventh Doctor, appearing in the Virgin New Adventures range of Doctor Who spin-offs. Her first appearance is in the novel Original Sin by Andy Lane, She is an Adjudicator; a policeman from 30th century Earth. She is described as being born into a family of pure African Xhosa stock.

Frank
A companion of the Eighth Doctor mentioned only by name in The Gallifrey Chronicles by Lance Parkin. Nothing more is known about this person.

Frobisher

Frobisher is a companion of both the Sixth Doctor and Seventh Doctor, appearing in the Doctor Who Magazine comic strip. The character is a Whifferdill, a species of shape-changing extraterrestrials. His preferred form is that of a penguin.

G

Gabby Gonzalez
Gabby Gonzalez travelled with the Tenth Doctor in the Tenth Doctor comics from Titan.

She is an aspiring artist who works in her father's restaurant and laundromat in New York.

Gus Goodman
Angus "Gus" Goodman, an American fighter pilot from an alternate timeline where World War II was still being fought in 1963, is a
companion of the Fifth Doctor in the Doctor Who Monthly comic strips. He first appears in the story Lunar Lagoon (DWM #76-#77), written by Steve Parkhouse and illustrated by Mick Austin. He was later drawn by Steve Dillon. The Doctor encounters him on an island in the Pacific, where the airman has crashed following a dogfight with a Japanese plane. Accepting his offer to be taken off the island, they first travel back to the Doctor's universe where they thwart a plan by the Meddling Monk and the Ice Warriors to create a gigantic sonic cannon. They next travel to the planet Celeste where the malevolent, frog-like businessman, Dogbolter, whom the Doctor offended when he refused to sell him the TARDIS (The Moderator, DWM #86-87), has sent a hitman, the Moderator, after the Doctor. Following the Doctor's trail back to Gus's world, The Moderator ambushes them and Gus is shot and killed.

Samson and Gemma Griffin
Samson Griffin and his sister Gemma are companions of the Eighth Doctor in the Big Finish audio adventure Terror Firma. The characters are played by Lee Ingleby and Lizzie Hopley. They meet the Doctor in Folkestone library, where Samson is a librarian, and follow him into the TARDIS. While exploring a time cruiser Samson and Gemma are captured by Davros, who gains control of their minds. While Davros monitors the Doctor's activities through Samson, he infects Gemma with a deadly virus that mutates humans into Daleks, using her to spread the disease around the world and pave the way for Davros to conquer the planet with a new race of Daleks. Eventually the Doctor frees Samson from Davros' control. Gemma's exact fate is left open to question. Another companion of the Doctor, C'rizz, tells the Doctor she has died, although it is implied that C'rizz has killed her. The Doctor returns Samson to Folkestone where, with his mother Harriet, a leader of the human resistance, he begins helping to rebuild Earth.

Samson and Gemma also appear in the short stories "The Long Midwinter" by Philip Purser-Hallard (published in Short Trips: The History of Christmas), "Dear John" (published in Short Trips: The Centenarian) and "The Company of Friends: Mary's Story". "The Long Midwinter" details another of Samson and Gemma's adventures, set on the brown dwarf world of Yesod.

H

Oliver Harper
Played by Tom Allen, Oliver Harper was a city trader from 1966. He joined the First Doctor and Steven Taylor, in the audio play The Perpetual Bond. He was motivated to escape with the Doctor as he was in immediate danger of being arrested for homosexual behaviour, which was illegal in the UK until 1967. This was revealed in his second story, The Cold Equations. In his third adventure, The First Wave, he is killed by Vardans, beings of pure energy. His mind continued to exist without form or ability to interact with others. He stayed with the Doctor, unbeknownst to him, finally fading out of existence during the Doctor's first regeneration. Oliver was the first ongoing companion created for the Companion Chronicles range.

I

Isaac
See William Hoffman

J

Flip Jackson
Philippa (Flip) Jackson is a young girl who, with her boyfriend Jared, is transported from modern day London to a sentient planet called Symbios on a tube train which passes through a temporal breach. There, Flip briefly meets the Sixth Doctor. In this first appearance, the 2011 audio drama The Crimes of Thomas Brewster, Flip and Jared meet the Sixth Doctor, who returns them to Earth. Flip returns in the January 2012 release, The Curse of Davros where, journeying home on a night bus, she and Jared witness the crash of a Dalek Scout Ship. Investigating, they find the Sixth Doctor, whose mind has been swapped with that of Davros. During this encounter Jared's mind is swapped with that of a Dalek. After helping the Doctor to stop Davros from changing the outcome of the Battle of Waterloo, and the Doctor and Jared have their minds returned to their respective bodies, she joins the Doctor on his travels while Jared returns to 2012. After a series of travels in the TARDIS, she becomes separated from the Doctor in Earth orbit and almost becomes host to a piece of alien space debris named "Scavenger". After teleporting from its grasp she is trapped floating in space once more. Realising she is running out of Oxygen, she records a message for the Doctor and uses her spacesuit thrusters to propel herself toward Earth, to be either rescued or die in the attempt. She is later revealed to have married Jared, but she is abducted on her wedding day as part of a convoluted plan to trap the Doctor (Quicksilver), which results in her rejoining the Doctor alongside her 'successor', Constance Clarke. The character is portrayed by Lisa Greenwood.

John Jones
John Jones is a musician who joins the Eleventh Doctor when the Doctor and Alice attend one of his early concerts in the 1960s. He is a chameleon who changes his look in every story and uses the persona of Xavi Moonburst (a reference to David Bowie and Ziggy Stardust). He appears in the first year of Titan's Eleventh Doctor comics.

Jason
Jason, a young nobleman from Revolutionary France, appeared in the stage play Doctor Who - The Ultimate Adventure, written by Terrance Dicks. Jason was played by Graeme Smith from 23 March to 15 July 1989, except from 21 to 23 April 1989 where he was portrayed by David Bingham. Bingham carried on in the role from 17 July 1989 until the end of the stage production on 19 August 1989. In the Big Finish Productions audio adaptation of the play the character is voiced is by former Hear'say member Noel Sullivan. Rescued from the Guillotine by the Doctor, Jason is already a companion of the Doctor at the start of the play. He becomes romantically involved with the character Crystal, and persuades her to join him and the Doctor on their travels in the TARDIS.

Jemima-Katy
A companion of the Eighth Doctor mentioned only by name in The Gallifrey Chronicles by Lance Parkin. The name is the same as that of a companion (played by Mel Giedroyc) being "auditioned" by Jon Pertwee in a sketch from the 1990s BBC radio comedy, The Skivers.

Angela Jennings
Angela Jennings is briefly a companion of the Sixth Doctor, who met her on the planet Torrok in 2191 in the Virgin Missing Adventures novel Time of Your Life by Steve Lyons.

Angela was born in 2171 and had black hair and green eyes. Her ID number was 9/12/44. Her father was killed by "outside perils" and her sister Ruth was taken away by Peace Keepers. Angela's time with the Doctor was sadly cut short when he left her aboard the abandoned space station used by the Meson Broadcasting Company. Although this was to keep her safe, Angela's body was killed by a techno-organic, data-consuming entity known as Krllxk. The last bits of Angela's consciousness absorbed by Krllxk died after the Meson station vaporised. The Doctor instead travelled with Angela's friend Grant Markham for a short time.

John and Gillian

John and Gillian are a young brother and sister, and companions of both the First Doctor and Second Doctor in the TV Comic comic strip based on the Doctor Who television programme. Although apparently human they refer to the Doctor as their grandfather, and at their first meeting the Doctor recognises them before they can introduce themselves. No mention is ever made of their parents and in their final adventure, by which time they are teenagers, the Doctor enrols them in the Galactic University on the planet Zebadee rather than returning them to 20th Century Earth.

Sam Jones

Samantha (Sam) Jones is a companion of the Eighth Doctor in the Eighth Doctor Adventures Doctor Who novels.

Josie Day
Josephine "Josie" Day appears in Doctor Who: The Eighth Doctor, a mini-series published by Titan Publishing. She is a young artist who, being homeless, took up residency in the Doctor's house, which he bought in one of his previous incarnations. She believes it to be abandoned, but the Eighth Doctor shows up. After saving her town, he promptly invites her to travel with him. After several adventures with the Doctor it is revealed in the final issue that she is in fact a living painting rescued by the Twelfth Doctor and Clara, the Twelfth Doctor sending her to his younger self to keep her safe and help her find her owne identity, the older Doctor recognizing that his younger self was 'better qualified' to help Josie explore her humanity. The series ends with the Doctor asking her to stay.

June
A university student who travels with the Tenth Doctor to the time of King Actaeus of Athens in the novel The Slitheen Excursion.

Sir Justin

Sir Justin, a medieval knight, accompanied the Fifth Doctor in the Doctor Who Monthly comic strip story The Tides of Time (DWM#61-#67), written by Steve Parkhouse and illustrated by Dave Gibbons.

Justin is a pious Christian knight from medieval England, transported to the 20th century by the demon Melanicus, where he collides with the TARDIS outside of the village of Stockbridge. Having been brought into the TARDIS, Justin believes the Doctor to be an angel of God, the TARDIS a miracle and their quest a crusade, despite the Doctor's attempts to persuade him otherwise. Eventually, with the help of Rassilon, Merlin, and the Matrix-powered Time Lord agent known as Shayde, the Doctor confronts Melanicus in a time-altered version of a Stockbridge church. During the ensuing fight the Doctor is knocked unconscious, while Justin kills Melanicus at the cost of his own life.
With the time stream restored the Doctor regains consciousness in the church, now named St. Justinian's, wondering if it has all been a dream. He then sees a statue of Sir Justin, with an inscribed epitaph referring obliquely to his adventures in time and space. It is suggested that Merlin was responsible for the memorial.

K

Anji Kapoor
Anji Kapoor is a companion of the Eighth Doctor, appearing in the Eighth Doctor Adventures series of novels. She is the first significant Asian recurring character in Doctor Who, although the books are contradictory regarding whether her parents are Indian or Pakistani.

Anya Kingdom
Anya Kingdom is a companion of the Fourth and Tenth Doctors in audio plays by Big Finish Productions. She travels with the Fourth Doctor under the false name of Ann Kelso but is later revealed to be Anya, the niece of Sara Kingdom.

Fitz Kreiner
Fitzgerald (Fitz) Kreiner is a companion of the Eighth Doctor and appears in the Eighth Doctor Adventures series of Doctor Who novels. The character also appears in the Big Finish Productions Doctor Who audio drama The Company of Friends, played by Matt Di Angelo, and by Ben Shenmeowzo in the BBV Productions audio dramas Faction Paradox: Hellscape - Unwanted Guest and it's following story Faction Paradox: Hellscape - Lilith Fades.

Elizabeth Klein
Elizabeth Klein (voiced by Tracey Childs) first appeared in the 2001 Big Finish Productions audio story Colditz. She was a British citizen of German descent who came from an alternate timeline in which the Nazis had won World War II. She was a scientist, working for the Reich, and put in charge of studying the Doctor's captured TARDIS. In it, she travelled from her version of 1965 back to 1944, where the Seventh Doctor erased her alternate timeline. She survived, however, and later resurfaced in Kenya, 1953 in the 2010 story A Thousand Tiny Wings, where the Doctor takes her on as a travelling companion. However, after she steals the Doctor's TARDIS and uses it to create a new timeline in which the Nazis rule the galaxy in The Architects of History, the Time Lords take action and send the Doctor of that alternate timeline to totally remove her from history. In the correct timeline, Elizabeth Klein was a member of UNIT in the 1970s. This version of Klein reappears in the 2012 audio play UNIT Dominion, where she learns of the existence of her alternate self. In July 2013, Klein returned for another trilogy of tales with the Seventh Doctor, also accompanied by her assistant Will Arrowsmith, the Doctor wanting her aid to both investigate the remaining anomalies of her paradoxical existence and help him tie up some loose ends in this life out of concern that his successor will be unable to be as ruthless as he has been.

Kroton

Kroton is a character appearing the Doctor Who Magazine comic strip. He is a Cyberman that has retained human emotions and becomes a companion of the Eighth Doctor.

L

Larna
Larna was a Time Lord who assisted the Doctor during The Infinity Doctors, and later appeared in The Gallifrey Chronicles. A Larna also appeared in Unnatural History, and recognised the Doctor, but it is unclear if this was the same character. A short story, "Birth of a Renegade" by Eric Saward published in the Radio Times special commemorating the 20th anniversary of Doctor Who, had previously established Lady Larna as the true Gallifreyan name of Susan Foreman.

Lorenzo
A companion of the Eighth Doctor first mentioned in a flashback sequence in the novel The Year of Intelligent Tigers by Kate Orman, which took place in the South Seas in 1935. Lorenzo is mentioned again in The Gallifrey Chronicles by Lance Parkin.

Louise
Louise (portrayed by Jill Curzon) is the niece of Dr. Who in the film Daleks' Invasion Earth 2150 A.D.. In the plot Louise takes the role filled by Barbara Wright in the television serial The Dalek Invasion of Earth, on which the film is based. The character also appears in the Doctor Who Magazine comic strip story Daleks Versus the Martians (1996).

M

Trix MacMillan
Beatrix (Trix) Macmillan is a companion of the Eighth Doctor, appearing in the Eighth Doctor Adventures series of Doctor Who novels. In various stories it is implies that she may have been a confidence trickster at some point, and she is portrayed as materialistic, deceptive and skilled in using disguises.

Mags
Mags is a character who first appeared in the televised Doctor Who serial The Greatest Show in the Galaxy. She is a werewolf from the planet Vulpana who was taken from her home by the explorer Captain Cook to serve as his companion. After an adventure on Segonax with the Seventh Doctor and Ace, she was finally freed from Cook and took over the running of the Psychic Circus with Kingpin.

She later left the Psychic Circus after her transformations became far too deadly to those around her for her to stay, she set out into the universe and was eventually reunited with the Seventh Doctor in the Big Finish audio play The Monsters of Gokroth where at the end of the play she became his travelling companion. She is portrayed by Jessica Martin.

Grant Markham
Grant Markham is a companion of the Sixth Doctor, appearing in Virgin Publishing's range of Doctor Who Missing Adventures novels. He is a human from the planet Agora.

Margaret
Margaret is among the companions of the Fourth Doctor kidnapped by The Nine in the Big Finish audio drama Companion Piece (2019). She is portrayed by Nerys Hughes. Nothing else is currently known about her.

Ellie Martin
Ellie Martin (played by Juliet Warner) is the companion of the Valeyard in the Big Finish play He Jests at Scars..., set in an alternate universe where the Valeyard won the Sixth Doctor's remaining incarnations in "The Trial of a Time Lord". An "eco-warrior", she was rescued by the Valeyard from being hit by a police car during an environmental protest, and she accompanied him on his quest to conquer time. He later killed her, to make the point that he was no longer the Doctor. It is hinted she might have known the Doctor before he became the Valeyard as she frequently refers to him, much to the Valeyard's annoyance, as the Doctor, "Champion of Justice".

In Big Finish's regular Doctor Who continuity, Martin is a friend of Sarah Jane Smith, and appeared in the first series of Sarah Jane audio adventures. When the Sarah Jane audios were initially announced, the role of Ellie Martin was listed as (books companion) Sam Jones; her "eco-warrior" past may be a reference to that former origin.

Heather McCrimmon
Heather McCrimmon was a companion of the Tenth Doctor in the comic strips printed in the Doctor Who Adventures magazine. A history student at Edinburgh university, she was created by a reader as part of a competition to create and design a new companion for the strip. She debuted in the issue on sale 31 December 2008. During her travels she was joined by another companion Wolfgang 'Wolfie' Ryter, who was likewise designed by a reader of the magazine. It is also suggested she's a descendant of Second Doctor TV companion Jamie McCrimmon. She departed in the story "Dead Line" which was published in the issue on sale 4 February 2010. However, she returned for a final appearance in the story "Lucky Heather" published on 25 March 2010 which, unusually for a Doctor Who Adventures comic story, took place during the Tenth Doctor's final TV story The End of Time.

Robert McIntosh
Played by Christian Coulson, Robert McIntosh was a young science student from Scotland, who assisted the Fifth Doctor in The Haunting of Thomas Brewster. This took place while the Doctor was spending a year in Victorian London, accidentally separated from Nyssa. Robert sacrificed his life for the Doctor, in the same story he was introduced.

Mila
Played by Jess Robinson and India Fisher, Mila appeared in three audio stories, Patient Zero, Paper Cuts and Blue Forgotten Planet. Mila was a human prisoner of the Daleks, who experimented on her using bio-engineered viruses. As a result of these endeavours, she lost most of her memories and eventually became invisible and non-corporeal, as well as gaining other strange abilities. She escaped from the Daleks and sneaked on board the First Doctor's TARDIS, possibly during the events of The Chase. She remained in the TARDIS, unseen by anyone for centuries. She silently watched the Doctor, growing obsessed by his heroics and longing to be a real companion. During the Sixth Doctor's life, she met Charley Pollard, the only companion unprotected by the TARDIS' biological defences. Mila managed to transfer her afflictions to Charley, while simultaneously adopting Charley's physical form. She was then able to travel with the Doctor, pretending to be Charley, while the real Charley was left invisible and alone. Eventually Charley was cured by the Viyrans and Mila gave her life to save the Doctor. The Viyrans also altered the Sixth Doctor's memories so that he remembers his adventures with Charley as being with Mila's name and face, thus avoiding the potential temporal paradox of the Sixth Doctor meeting an older Charley before his eighth incarnation would save the younger one.

Lucie Miller

Lucie Miller is a companion of the Eighth Doctor, who appears in a series of Doctor Who audio plays produced by Big Finish Productions. The character is voiced by Sheridan Smith. The Eighth Doctor mentions her by name in the 2013 mini-episode, "The Night of the Doctor", which features his regeneration into the War Doctor.

Ruth Mills
Ruth Mills (played by Siri O'Neal) was the companion and foster daughter of an alternate version of the Doctor in the Big Finish Productions Doctor Who Unbound audio play Full Fathom Five by David Bishop.

This Doctor (played by David Collings) had raised Ruth since 2039, when her father, Dr Vollmer, was lost in the destruction of the Deep-sea Energy Exploration Project (DEEP) undersea naval base. When the DEEP was rediscovered in 2066, the Doctor hired a mini-sub to get to the base before the naval recovery team. However, Ruth stowed away on board the mini-sub against the Doctor's wishes.

After Ruth and the Doctor reached the base, Ruth eventually discovered that the Doctor was responsible for her father's death. There had been illegal genetic experimentation going on in the base and the Doctor had killed Vollmer to prevent any information on the experiments from getting out. Still believing that the ends justified the means, the Doctor had simply returned to the DEEP base to regain his TARDIS, which had been left there when he abandoned the base.

Horrified that the man who raised her had been lying to her, Ruth shot the Doctor and watched his face change. Ruth shot the new incarnation of the Doctor, and as he changed again, wondered how many times she would have to shoot him before he stayed dead.

Miranda
Miranda is a companion and the adopted daughter of the Eighth Doctor, appearing in the Eighth Doctor Adventures series of novels series published by BBC Books. The character also featured in her own short-lived comic book.

Tara Mishra
Tara Mishra was a companion of the Ninth Doctor alongside Rose Tyler and Captain Jack Harkness in the Titan Comics series Doctor Who: The Ninth Doctor.

Sally Morgan
Private Sally Morgan met the Seventh Doctor while she was undergoing a military experiment involving psychic abilities in the year 2020. During the procedure she was known as Number 18, and her irrational fear of being forgotten was exploited. At the end of this first story (the 2011 audio, House of Blue Fire) she left with the Doctor. She is heard again in Project: Nirvana and Black and White and Gods and Monsters, all alongside another new military companion, Captain Aristedes. Sally is voiced by Amy Pemberton.

N

Nina
A companion of the Eighth Doctor mentioned in The Gallifrey Chronicles by Lance Parkin and possibly taken from the Telos novella Rip Tide by Louise Cooper.

O

Alice Obiefune
Alice Obiefune was a companion of the Eleventh Doctor in Titan's Eleventh Doctor series.

Molly O'Sullivan

Molly O'Sullivan (played by Ruth Bradley) is an Irish Voluntary Aid Detachment nursing assistant in World War I and companion of the Eighth Doctor. The character first appears in Dark Eyes (2012), an audio box set from Big Finish Productions. She first meets the Doctor in the battlefields of France, subsequently becoming involved in a chase across time pursued by the Daleks. She is described as having extremely dark eyes, which are revealed to be caused by "retrogenitor particles" which the Daleks have implanted in her in an attempted to destroy the Time Lords. Ultimately the plan backfires when the Dalek Time Controller rewrites time, eliminating the particles. Molly subsequently returns to the First World War battlefields, later being reunited with the Doctor in 1918 in the midst of a Viyran incursion. Following this she once more becomes the Doctor's travelling companion, helping him to defeat the Eminence with the assistance of Liv Chenka, who subsequently joins Molly and the Doctor on their travels. She is mentioned by the Eighth Doctor in the TV mini-episode "The Night of the Doctor".

Olla
Olla was very briefly a companion of the Seventh Doctor in the Doctor Who Magazine comic strips. Olla was a Dreilyn, a heat vampire whose race drew sustenance from draining the heat from other beings, although never enough to kill. She first met the Doctor and Frobisher on A-Lux in the story A Cold Day in Hell (DWM#130-#133), written by Simon Furman and drawn by John Ridgway. A-Lux was a resort planet which the Ice Warriors were planning to freeze and turn into a new Mars. Olla helped the Doctor and Frobisher defeat the Ice Warriors, and when Frobisher elected to stay behind, the Doctor took her on board as his newest companion. The Doctor, however, was mildly disturbed by the way Olla kept waiting on him hand and foot.

Her stint in the TARDIS was short-lived. In the very next story, Redemption (DWM #134), Olla's former master, the Vachysian warlord Skaroux (a legal enforcer for the Galactic Federation), intercepted the TARDIS and demanded her return. It transpired that Olla had stolen Skaroux's money and then become a fugitive. The Doctor agreed to hand her over on the condition that she receive a fair trial, and Skaroux and Olla left together.

P

Majenta Pryce
Majenta Pryce is introduced in the Doctor Who Magazine issue 394 comic strip "Hotel Historia" as an alien entrepreneur running an illegal time-travel operation on Earth. Her organisation is shut down by the Tenth Doctor, and she swears revenge against him when she is arrested. The character returns in "Thinktwice", a three-part story beginning in DWM issue 400. She is now a convict on a space-station prison where the inmates are subject to repeated memory wipes, supposedly to rehabilitate them but actually to feed parasitic lifeforms called the Memovax. The Doctor defeats the Memovax and rescues Majenta. Her memories do not return, however, and holding the Doctor responsible for this, she insists on staying with him until he finds a way to reverse the process.

Elements of Majenta's past subsequently come to light in the stories "Mortal Beloved" (DWM #406-407), "The Age of Ice" (DWM# 408-410) and "The Crimson Hand" (DWM# 416-420), in which it is revealed that she is part of a powerful crime organisation called the Crimson Hand, a group of ruthless beings who possessed the Manus Mallificus, a hand-shaped device that can reshape reality. Having accepted their invitation to join the group, Majenta is horrified by their use of the Malus to destroy an inhabited planet. She attempts to escape but at the last minute accepts the Crimson Hand's offer to rejoin them, and seemingly destroys the Doctor. Majenta then attempts to use the Malus to convert her home planet, Vessica, into a utopia. When a spatial rift threatens Veccia, and the inhabitants rebel against her rule, Majenta calls back the Doctor, who in reality she has only sent away. With the Doctor's help, Majenta cuts the rest of the Hand off from their power source, destroying them and nearly dying in the process. Majenta then settles on the planet Redemption ("The Deep Hereafter", DWM #412).

Charley Pollard

Charlotte (Charley) Pollard is a companion of the Eighth Doctor, appearing in a series of Doctor Who audio plays produced by Big Finish Productions. The character is voiced by India Fisher. She also travels with the Sixth Doctor, and is mentioned by Eighth Doctor in the episode The Night of the Doctor.

R

Ramsay
Ramsay is a Vortisaur encountered by the Eighth Doctor in the Time Vortex in the Big Finish audio play Storm Warning. The Doctor's companion, Charley, names it Ramsay after its resemblance to James Ramsay MacDonald. Ramsay soon begins to weaken, having been away from the vortex for too long. A temporary solution is found in Sword of Orion, but the Doctor and Charley know that he must ultimately be returned to his natural habitat. As they approach the centre of the vortex, however, he attacks Charley. Ramsay has sensed the fracturing web of time around her, the result of the Doctor's intervention preventing her death in the Airship R101 crash. The Doctor manages to expel Ramsay through the open doors of the TARDIS, but the ship and the Doctor are damaged in the process, leading to the events of Minuet in Hell.

Ria (Lies in Ruins)
Ria is a companion to the Eighth Doctor appearing in Big Finish audio story Lies in Ruins. She travels with him during the Time War. It is later revealed that she is a robot the Doctor constructed to accompany him during the war. She is portrayed by Alexandra Riley.

Ria (Party Animals)
Ria was a companion of the unspecified future incarnation of the Doctor seen in the Doctor Who Magazine comic strip Party Animals (DWM #173), where she attended the birthday party of the Doctor's friend Bonjaxx on the space station Maruthea, situated at the centre of the space-time vortex. Along with that future Doctor, she met the Seventh Doctor and Ace who were also attending the party and was involved in the subsequent brawl provoked by an inebriated Beep the Meep. Nothing else is known about her, although her Doctor's appearance was subsequently used as a disguise in a complex ruse by the Eighth Doctor against the time-travelling mercenaries known as the Threshold.

The appearance of Ria was a sly reference to the series of unofficial audio plays produced as the Audio Visuals series in the 1980s, which featured Nicholas Briggs as the Doctor. Ria was played by several different actresses including Liz Knight, Patricia Merrick and Heather Barker.

Ruby Duvall
Assisted the Doctor in the Virgin New Adventures Novel Iceberg; after having one adventure, the Doctor left her behind in 2006.

S

Hex Schofield
Thomas Hector "Hex" Schofield is a companion of the Seventh Doctor, appearing in a series of Doctor Who audio plays produced by Big Finish Productions.

Lady Serena
Lady Serena (Lady Serenadellatrovella) is the companion of the Second Doctor in the Past Doctor Adventures novel World Game. Serena is a member of an eminent but un-influential Time Lord family, who has ambitions to become President of the Time Lord High Council. She is assigned to accompany the Second Doctor on a mission for the Celestial Intervention Agency, to improve her political credentials. Serena and the Doctor initially have an uneasy relationship. She is effectively his parole officer, having the authority to give him orders, and objects to him calling her his assistant. The Doctor resents having a companion forced upon him. During the course of their mission, however, they begin to appreciate each other's talents.

Uncovering a plot to assassinate the Duke of Wellington at a ball held on the eve of Waterloo, Serena is killed when a shot intended for Wellington destroys both of her hearts, preventing her from regenerating. She is buried in a simple grave marked only with her name; SERENA. Once back on Gallifrey, the Doctor refuses to go on any more missions for the Agency unless various conditions are met, including the placing of Serena's name on the Gallifreyan Honour Roll, and that he be allowed to tell her family how she died.

Sheena
Sheena is a companion to the Eighth Doctor during the early stages of the Time War. How she came to join the Doctor is thus far unknown. She is seen with him during Big Finish Productions audio drama The Starship of Theseus, in which the timelines begin to change due to the war. She goes by the names Emma and Louise in some of the shifted timelines before being erased completely. She is played by Olivia Vinall.

Mathew Sharpe
Mathew Sharpe (George Shear) is a space pilot from the far future who the Sixth Doctor is seen travelling with in the Big Finish story The Lure of the Nomad. It is later revealed that he is one of the Myriad, people from a future universe trying to destroy the current one by manipulating the Doctor. He is eventually left on a ship about to explode. When he begs the Doctor to save him the Doctor declines saying he's "never known anyone of that name" and Sharpe is presumed dead.

Helen Sinclair
Helen Sinclair is a companion of the Eighth Doctor in the Doom Coalition series. Initially working as a museum assistant in 1963, but frustrated at her inability to advance further due to gender stereotypes, Helen assists the Doctor and his companion Liv Chenka in investigating a mystery surrounding a collection of artefacts, and is subsequently invited to travel with them after she is accused of the theft of the artefacts. She is portrayed by Hattie Morahan.

Izzy Sinclair

Isabelle (Izzy) Sinclair is a companion of Eighth Doctor, appearing in the Doctor Who Magazine comic strip. The character also appears in the Big Finish Productions audio drama The Company of Friends, where she is portrayed by Jemima Rooper.

Evelyn Smythe

Dr. Evelyn Smythe is a companion of the Sixth Doctor, appearing in the series of Doctor Who audio plays produced by Big Finish Productions. The character was played by Maggie Stables.

Susan

In the film Dr. Who and the Daleks (1965), Susan (portrayed by Roberta Tovey) is one of Dr. Who's granddaughters. Her role is similar to that filled by Susan Foreman in the television serial The Daleks, on which the film is based. The character also appears in the Dell comic strip adaptation of the film, the follow-up film adaptation Daleks' Invasion Earth 2150 A.D. (1966), the Doctor Who Magazine comic strip stories Daleks Versus the Martians (1996) and Dr. Who and the Mechonoids (2022), and the short story The House on Oldark Moor (2000) by Justin Richards. Susan is portrayed as a child and thus younger than the teenage, television version of the character. She is depicted as being brave and resourceful, and rather less timid than her television counterpart.

Ssard

Ssard is a companion of the Eighth Doctor, appearing in the Radio Times Doctor Who comic strip.

Bernice Summerfield

Professor Bernice (Benny) Summerfield is a companion of the Seventh Doctor, appearing in the New Adventures Doctor Who novels and in the series of Bernice Summerfield audio plays and a few Doctor Who audio plays produced by Big Finish Productions.

T

Bev Tarrant
Bev Tarrant is an art thief from the 43rd century, whose first appearance was in the Big Finish Productions audio drama The Genocide Machine. She reappeared in the audio drama Dust Breeding, at the end of which she travels to the 20th century with the Seventh Doctor and Ace. She seems to have made at least one more journey in the TARDIS, as she is next heard of in the 27th century in Big Finish's Bernice Summerfield audio drama The Bellotron Incident, where it is revealed that "a mutual friend" has brought her to Bernice's time. All three of these stories were written by Mike Tucker.

Tarrant later became a regular character in the Bernice Summerfield books and audio dramas, where she was played by Louise Faulkner. Her surname is an in-joke based on the fan perception that Terry Nation, the creator of the Daleks, was overly fond of using the name "Tarrant" in his scripts.

Stacy Townsend
Stacy Townsend is a companion of the fictional character in the Eighth Doctor, appearing in the Radio Times Doctor Who comic strip.

Fey Truscott-Sade

Fey Truscott-Sade is a companion of the Eighth Doctor, appearing in the Doctor Who Magazine comic strip .

W

Cindy Wu
Cindy Wu was a Companion of the Tenth Doctor and best friend of Gabby Gonzalez from Titan Comics.

Mrs Wibbsey
Fenella Wibbsey, played by Susan Jameson, was the Fourth Doctor's housekeeper in the Hornets' Nest CD dramas. Formerly a possessed pawn of the Hornet Queen, she first encountered the Doctor in Cromer in 1932, where she was the curator of the Palace of Curios, a small curiosity shop. Released from the Hornets' influence, she was taken by the Doctor to his house in Sussex, in the early 21st century. She joined him and Mike Yates in their descent into the papier-mâché brain of a stuffed zebra where the Hornets had built their primary nest. After they defeated the Queen and put paid to the Hornets' nefarious schemes, she settled into the house and took care of it while the Doctor continued his travels. He returned to check in on her a year later in the sequel, Demon Quest, whereupon she traded one of the vital components of his TARDIS to a mysterious figure. The Doctor insisted that she accompany him on a chase through time to retrieve it. While on the journey, she exhibited odd flashes of insight, such as making a prescient prediction while posing as the goddess "Wibbsentia" in pre-Roman Britain. This was later shown to be an effect of the Demon and the Hornets, who were trying to lure the Doctor to the dead world Sepulchre, there to turn the Doctor into a dimensional atlas. Mrs Wibbsey was nearly killed in the attempt to rescue the Doctor after she was again infested with the Hornets. She returns in Serpent Crest, where she and the Doctor are kidnapped by robots and taken through a wormhole in time and space. The Doctor eventually returns her to present day Nest Cottage, giving the house to her as he leaves in his TARDIS.

Will Arrowsmith
Played by Christian Edwards, Will begins travelling with the Seventh Doctor and Klein in the Big Finish audio drama Persuasion, as Klein's Assistant at UNIT

William Hoffman
William Hoffman, also known as Isaac, first appears in the short story Euterpe: An Overture Too Early by Simon Guerrier in the Big Finish Short Trips anthology The Muses. He later appears in most of the short stories in Short Trips: Time Signature, edited by Guerrier.
Though the Doctor has met him previously in his own timeline, William's association with the Time Lord begins when, as a young man, he encounters the Sixth Doctor and agrees to join him on a fishing trip. This expedition takes them to a future Earth, populated by an advanced hunter-gatherer society. They next visit London in William's near future, and a walking city in the distant future. During their travels William develops a latent talent for music, and becomes fascinated with a tune which acts directly upon the time vortex. He parts company with the Doctor in an Eastern European country in the 1950s. Now using the name "Isaac" he becomes a prominent composer in his adopted country, his compositions incorporating the music of the vortex. He meets the Doctor on two subsequent occasions, both of them earlier in the Doctor's timeline than their original meeting. His meeting with the Third Doctor in London in the 1970s (their first, from the Doctor's point of view) takes place shortly before Isaac's murder by forces wishing to protect the vortex. After scattering Isaac's ashes, the Eighth Doctor deals with the powers attempting to excise Isaac's compositions from the universe. This process entails changing the young William's timeline so that he never joined the sixth Doctor on his fishing trip, but instead developed his musical talent without the influence of the vortex. The effects of this action upon history are not made clear.

Jenny Wilson
Jenny was one of the Doctor's companions in the stage play Doctor Who and the Daleks in the Seven Keys to Doomsday. She was played by Wendy Padbury, who had previously played Zoe Heriot. Not to be confused with Jenny from the 2008 episode "The Doctor's Daughter."

In the Big Finish audio adaptation, she was played by Wendy Padbury's daughter Charlie Hayes.

Guinevere Winchester
Guinevere Winchester, known as Guin, appears in the short story "Revenants" by Peter Anghelides. She was a historian, before becoming a companion of the red-haired future Doctor mentioned in Battlefield, and has an ex-husband named Lance. Given that this Doctor took the identity of Merlin, it is unlikely that her name, and that of her husband, is a coincidence.

Wolsey

Wolsey (named for Cardinal Wolsey) was a cat given to the Seventh Doctor by Joan in the novel Human Nature by Paul Cornell. Wolsey travelled in the TARDIS until the events of The Dying Days by Lance Parkin. The Eighth Doctor then gave Wolsey to Bernice Summerfield, and the cat remained with her for the remainder of the New Adventures. Wolsey also appeared in some of the Bernice Summerfield audio dramas and books from Big Finish Productions. In the audio drama Oh No It Isn't! by Paul Cornell, Wolsey is voiced by actor Nicholas Courtney, better known for his role as Brigadier Lethbridge-Stewart.

Z

Zog
Zog, an alien slave, appeared in the stage play Doctor Who - The Ultimate Adventure, written by Terrance Dicks.

Zog was a slave who served at the Bar Galactica run by Madame Delilah. When the Doctor, Jason and Crystal arrived, they found Karl and his mercenaries there waiting for them. Crystal formed a friendship with Zog and the three took Zog with them when they fled the bar. Zog continued to travel with the Doctor, Jason and Crystal at the end of the play. In the short story Face Value by Steve Lyons, published in Short Trips and Sidesteps, it is revealed that Zog is an Aldeberian tyrant, and unbeknownst to this travelling companions is planning to enslave the universe. Zog also appeared alongside assorted monsters in the 1993 charity special Dimensions in Time.

See also
List of Doctor Who supporting characters: Companions

References

 
Spin-off companions
Doctor Who spin-off
Companion (Spin-off)